Dhamu is a retired Indian actor and comedian who mainly acts in Tamil films. He is known for his role as Otteri Nari in Ghilli (2004).<ref>{{Cite web|url=https://cinema.vikatan.com/tamil-cinema/155357-actor-dhamu-shares-ghilli-movie-experience|title= ' 'ஒக்கடு'வில் இல்லாத 'ஓட்டேரி நரி' 'கில்லி'யில் எப்படி வந்தது? 'கில்லி' கதை சொல்லும் தாமு ' [Although the character is not in Okkadu, how did Otteri Nari appear in Ghilli] #15YearsOfGhilli|language=ta|website=Vikatan}}</ref> He was a part of Gaana Galata Group, a popular touring and acting comedy troupe. Since then, he has appeared in several films. He has quit mainstream acting and has opened an agency to represent comedy shows known as 'Tamarai Bharani Comedy Agency'.  He once hosted a program "Kalakkal Comedy" on Sun TV. He worked as assistant to the former Indian President A. P. J. Abdul Kalam for seven years. He was also a children's education advocate.

Filmography
actor

dubbing artist
 Vagai Chandrasekhar - Rasamagan''

References

External links
 Review of Alli Arjuna, in which he appeared
 Dhamu on IMDb

Tamil male actors
Indian male comedians
Living people
Tamil comedians
Male actors in Tamil cinema
20th-century Indian male actors
1965 births